Friday's Child may refer to:

Music 

 Friday's Child (album), a 2003 album by Will Young
 "Friday's Child" (Will Young song), a 2004 single from the album
 "Friday's Child" (Wendy Matthews song), 1992
 "Friday's Child", a 1965 song written by Van Morrison and recorded by Them
 "Friday's Child" (1965 song), written by Lee Hazlewood and performed by Nancy Sinatra on the 1967 TV special Movin' With Nancy
 "Friday's Child", a song by Bradley Joseph from the 1994 album Hear the Masses

Other 

 Friday's Child (novel), a 1944 novel by Georgette Heyer
 "Friday's Child" (poem), a 1958 poem by W. H. Auden about Dietrich Bonhoeffer
 "Friday's Child" (Star Trek: The Original Series), a 1967 second season episode of Star Trek
Age Out, a 2018 American crime drama film formerly named Friday's Child

See also 
 "Monday's Child", an old children's rhyme and the origin of the phrase